Jarl "Viking" Hulldén (December 26, 1885 – October 18, 1913) was a Finnish sailor who competed in the 1912 Summer Olympics. He was a crew member of the Finnish boat Heatherbell, which won the bronze medal in the 12 metre class.

References

External links 
 
 
 

1885 births
1913 deaths
Finnish male sailors (sport)
Olympic sailors of Finland
Olympic bronze medalists for Finland
Olympic medalists in sailing
Medalists at the 1912 Summer Olympics
Sailors at the 1912 Summer Olympics – 12 Metre